uThukela is one of the 11 districts of the KwaZulu-Natal province of South Africa. The seat of uThukela is the city of Ladysmith. The majority of its 668,848 people speak IsiZulu (2011 Census). The district code is DC23.

Geography

Neighbours
uThukela is surrounded by:
 Amajuba to the north (DC25)
 uMgungundlovu to the east (DC22)
 uMzinyathi to the south (DC24)
 the kingdom of Lesotho to the south-east
 Thabo Mofutsanyane in the Free State to the west (DC19)

Local municipalities
The district contains the following local municipalities:

Demographics
The following statistics are from the 2001 census.

Gender

Age

Politics

Election results
Election results for uThukela in the South African general election, 2004.
 Population 18 and over: 350 092 [53.29% of total population]
 Total votes: 177 230 [26.98% of total population]
 Voting % estimate: 50.62% votes as a % of population 18 and over

References

External links
 Official Website

District Municipalities of KwaZulu-Natal
Uthukela District Municipality